The NOCO 400 is an annual NASCAR Cup Series stock car race held at the  Martinsville Speedway in Ridgeway, Virginia. It is the first of two Cup Series races at the track, the other one being the Xfinity 500 in the NASCAR playoffs.

The race was previously 500 laps in length before it was shortened to 400 laps starting in 2022.

Unlike other races which the winner receives a trophy, the winner of this race and other NASCAR races at Martinsville receives a grandfather clock, which has been a tradition since 1964.

History

The race had no name from 1950 to 1955, before taking the name Virginia 500 in 1956. 

Goody's Powder, which was the title sponsor of the spring Martinsville Cup Series race from 1996 to 2000 and the fall Martinsville Cup Series race from 1983 to 1995, returned as the title sponsor of the spring race in 2007 to promote their new orange-flavored brand, Cool Orange, with the race title being Goody's Cool Orange 500. During this time, this race was the sixth race of the season and the first race where the current season's owner point standings were used to determine which cars were "go-or-go-homers" and needed to qualify into the race. (For the first five races, it was the previous season's owner point standings used to determine which cars were locked in the race.)

From 2008 to 2012, the fall Cup Series race at Martinsville was sponsored Tums, which was owned by the same parent company (British pharmaceutical conglomerate GSK plc) as Goody's. In 2013, they reduced their title sponsorship to only the fall race with Goody's replacing Tums as the brand that was advertised in the race sponsorship. Legendary NASCAR and Richard Petty sponsor STP became the title sponsor of the spring race starting in 2013 and remained through 2019.

In 2020, Blue-Emu took over naming rights for the race as part of a multi-year deal with NASCAR.

In 2022, the race was shortened to 400 laps.

In 2023, The NOCO Company, which makes car parts such as batteries, battery chargers and jumper cables, replaced Blue-Emu as the title sponsor of the race.

Notable races
1953: Herb Thomas was originally declared the winner, but a recheck showed that he had been credited with an extra lap.
1971: Controversy dogged Richard Petty's win as he lost his gas cap (dry-break fuel couplers were not mandated until 1974) during the race but was not black-flagged; there had been incidents of drivers flagged to get gas caps under green.
1973: David Pearson won his first short track race since 1971, driving the Wood Brothers Mercury.
1976: Darrell Waltrip took the win, the first for the DiGard Motorsports Chevrolet.
1979: Richard Petty posted his first win in a Chevrolet and first short track win since 1975.
1981: Morgan Shepherd stunned the field with his first career Winston Cup win. It also marked the first victory since October 1963 for the Pontiac nameplate, who had been on a seventeen-year hiatus from NASCAR. Of Shepherd's four career victories, this was the only one at a track other than Atlanta.
1982: After nearly a dozen second-place finishes, Harry Gant pulled down his first win.
1984: Geoff Bodine edged Ron Bouchard for the win, the first for Bodine and the first for Hendrick Motorsports; it was also the first for crew chief Harry Hyde since 1977.
1986: Ricky Rudd won a race where wrecks and blown engines put the entire field behind him at least one lap down.
1989: Darrell Waltrip won, the final win for Chevrolet's bubble-glassed Monte Carlo race car; the Monte Carlo was replaced by the Lumina.
1990: Geoff Bodine posted his first win with Junior Johnson.
1997: Jeff Gordon edged Bobby Hamilton for the win, ending a four-race win streak in the Virginia 500 by Rusty Wallace.
1998: Bobby Hamilton drove the Morgan-McClure Motorsports Chevrolet to the win; he engaged in several bouts of multi-lap drag-racing with John Andretti, driving the Petty Enterprises Pontiac that Hamilton had driven the previous three seasons.
1999: John Andretti lost a lap after being tagged by Ward Burton; he made up the lap and ran down Jeff Burton; in the final ten laps he and Burton raced nose to nose for several laps before Andretti rallied to the win, his first for Petty Enterprises, the 200th short track win for the team, and the first for the team since 1997.
2002: Bobby Labonte posted his first career short-track win.
2004: Rusty Wallace posted his final Nextel Cup win.
2007: This was the second race for NASCAR's new Cup Series car, the Car of Tomorrow. Hendrick Motorsports teammates Jeff Gordon and Jimmie Johnson had an exciting battle for the win in the closing laps with Johnson prevailing despite Gordon's attempts to pass him and him hitting the side of Johnson's car and Johnson's bumper multiple times while attempting to pass him.
2010: Denny Hamlin stormed four-abreast through traffic on a late restart to steal the win.
2012: Ryan Newman stormed to the checkered flag because of the wreck that happened before. Clint Bowyer hit both Jimmie Johnson and Jeff Gordon during the first attempt. Newman held off A. J. Allmendinger on the second attempt to win the Goody's Fast Relief 500.
2014: Kurt Busch posted his first win with Stewart-Haas Racing after passing Jimmie Johnson with eleven laps to go.  The win was Busch's first in two seasons following his firing from Penske Racing and numerous confrontations with media.  The race lead changed 33 times, a track record, breaking the 31 sets in Kevin Harvick's 2011 win.
2018: The race was postponed to Monday due to snow. Clint Bowyer won the race, breaking a 190-race winless streak dating back to 2012.
2019: Brad Keselowski dominated by leading 446 laps and winning the race.
2020: The race was scheduled to be the track's first-ever night race in the Cup Series.

Past winners

Notes
1957: Race shortened due to crash.
1961 (first): Race abandoned as a result of rain. Under current rules, it would not be declared official as less than 50% of the race distance was completed.
1961 (second): A replacement race for the original 1961 race.
1970, 1977, and 1995: Race shortened due to rain.
1974: Race shortened due to the 1973-74 energy crisis.
1998 and 2010: Race postponed from Sunday to Monday due to rain.
2010, 2012, and 2022: Race extended due to a NASCAR Overtime finish. 2012 took two attempts.
2018: Race postponed from Sunday to Monday due to snow.
2020: Race postponed from May 9 to June 10 due to the COVID-19 pandemic.
2021: Race started on Saturday night but finished on Sunday afternoon due to rain.

Track length notes
1950–1969: 0.5 mile course
1970–1983: 0.525 mile course
1984–present: 0.526 mile course

Multiple winners (drivers)

Multiple winners (teams)

Manufacturer wins

References

External links
 

1949 establishments in Virginia
 
NASCAR Cup Series races
Recurring sporting events established in 1949
Annual sporting events in the United States